Aveau Tuala Lepale Niko Faitala Palamo is a Samoan rugby player, judge, politician and former member of the Legislative Assembly of Samoa.  He is a member of the Tautua Samoa Party.

Aveau is a former Manu Samoa 15s and 7s rugby player and coach.  He was elected to the Legislative Assembly of Samoa in the 2011 election, representing the constituency of Faleata East. Aveau beat 3 other candidates from the villages of Vaimoso, Lepea and Vailoa to gain the seat, with a convincing win of more than 200 votes over the second place candidate from Lepea. He ran again in the 2016 election, but was unsuccessful.

Following his departure from politics Palamo coached the Samoa women's national rugby union team. In May 2018 he was appointed Director of the 2019 Pacific Games Committee, but he resigned in November of that year due to differences with the committee.

In December 2019 Palamo was appointed as a judge of the Lands and Titles court.

References

External links
Niko Palamo international stats

Living people
Members of the Legislative Assembly of Samoa
Samoan chiefs
Samoan rugby union coaches
Tautua Samoa Party politicians
Year of birth missing (living people)
Land and Titles Court of Samoa judges
Sportsperson-politicians
Rugby union centres
20th-century Samoan people
21st-century Samoan politicians
Samoan rugby union players
Samoa international rugby union players
Samoa national rugby union team coaches